The canton of Saint-Amour is an administrative division of the Jura department, eastern France. Its borders were modified at the French canton reorganisation which came into effect in March 2015. Its seat is in Saint-Amour.

It consists of the following communes:
 
Andelot-Morval
Augea
Augisey
Balanod
Beaufort-Orbagna
Broissia
Cesancey
La Chailleuse
Chevreaux
Cousance
Cressia
Cuisia
Digna
Gigny
Gizia
Graye-et-Charnay
Loisia
Mallerey
Maynal
Monnetay
Montagna-le-Reconduit
Montfleur
Montlainsia
Montrevel
Rosay
Rotalier
Saint-Amour
Sainte-Agnès
Thoissia
Les Trois-Châteaux
Val-d'Épy
Val-Sonnette
Val Suran
Véria

References

Cantons of Jura (department)